The 2022 Women's EuroHockey Indoor Championship II was the fourteenth edition of the Women's EuroHockey Indoor Championship II, the second level of the women's European indoor hockey championships organized by the European Hockey Federation. It took place from 21 to 23 January 2022 at the Pazo dos Deportes Paco Paz in Ourense, Spain.

Spain won their second Women's EuroHockey Indoor Championship II title by finishing top of the round-robin pool and were promoted to the Women's EuroHockey Indoor Championship in 2024 together with Belgium, Poland and Switzerland.

Qualified teams
Participating nations have qualified based on their final ranking from the 2020 competition.

Standings

Results

See also
2022 Men's EuroHockey Indoor Championship II
2022 Women's EuroHockey Indoor Championship

References

Women's EuroHockey Indoor Championship II
Women 2
International women's field hockey competitions hosted by Spain
EuroHockey Indoor Championship II
EuroHockey Indoor Championship II
EuroHockey Indoor Championship II
Sport in Ourense